Ivesia gordonii is a species of flowering plant in the rose family known by the common name Gordon's mousetail. It is native to the mountain ranges of the western United States from California to Montana. This is a tuft-forming perennial plant which grows in rocky areas. It produces a clump of erect stems and tail-like leaves. Each leaf is a thick, rounded strip of small, green, lobed leaflets which overlap. They bear hairy, glandular inflorescences of clustered flowers. Each flower has five yellow-green triangular sepals and five tiny spoon-shaped yellow petals. In the mouth of the flower are five stamens and a few thready pistils.

References

External links
Jepson Manual Treatment
Photo gallery

gordonii